The 2020 IIHF World Championship Division IV was an international ice hockey tournament run by the International Ice Hockey Federation.

The tournament would have been held in Bishkek, Kyrgyzstan from 3 to 5 March 2020.

On 2 March 2020, the tournament was cancelled due to the COVID-19 pandemic.

Planned participants

Match officials
Three referees and four linesmen were selected for the tournament.

Standings

Planned schedule
All times are local (UTC+6).

References

External links
Official website

2020
Division IV
Ice hockey events cancelled due to the COVID-19 pandemic